Jacqueline Dalya (August 3, 1918November 25, 1980) was an American film and stage actress who began her career in the 1940s, appearing in films and on Broadway.

Biography

Early life
Dalya was born August 3, 1918 in New York City.

Career
She appeared in numerous films in the 1940s, including Viva Cisco Kid, Primrose Path, One Million B.C., The Gay Caballero, Sky Raiders, Lady from Louisiana, Blood and Sand, Charlie Chan in Rio, A Tragedy at Midnight, I Married an Angel, The Secret Code, Submarine Base, So's Your Uncle, Crazy House, Flesh and Fantasy, Mystery of the 13th Guest, Voice in the Wind, Bathing Beauty, Song of Mexico, Queen of Burlesque, Adventures of Casanova, Mystery in Mexico, and Smugglers' Cove.

On Broadway, Dalya appeared in The French Touch (1945) and Now I Lay Me Down to Sleep (1950). In 1947, she made newspaper headlines after being injured while giving autographs to fans in New York City; when a fan grabbed her ankle and jerked it, Dalya fell, hit her head on the sidewalk, and suffered a skull fracture.

Her film credits from the 1950s include Wabash Avenue and  Mystery Submarine. She later appeared in Blood Mania (1970) before making her final film appearance in 1972's Miss Melody Jones.

Marriages
Dalya married screenwriter William Conselman in January 1941 in Las Vegas, Nevada. They were divorced in 1944. She wed lyricist Bob Hilliard in 1949, and they remained married until his death in 1971.

Death
Dalya died on November 25, 1980, in Los Angeles, California.

Filmography

References

External links

 
 
 

1918 births
1980 deaths
20th-century American actresses
Actresses from New York City
American film actresses
American stage actresses